"Sonnentanz" is the debut single by Austrian electronic music duo Klangkarussell. The song was written and produced by Tobias Rieser and Adrian Held. It was originally published through the duo's SoundCloud on 29 September 2011. It was officially released as a single on 23 July 2012 digitally with remixes through the label Stil Vor Talent.  After the track became a viral hit and entered the charts by downloads only, it was released physically in German speaking countries on 14 September 2012 (CD) and 27 September 2012 (vinyl). The song has reached the top 10 in 6 countries (Austria, Belgium, Germany, Netherlands, Switzerland and the United Kingdom). A second version, titled "Sonnentanz (Sun Don't Shine)", features vocals from Will Heard. This version was released in the United Kingdom on 15 August 2013. Both tracks were included in their 2014 debut album Netzwerk. A third version, titled "Sun Don't Shine" and featuring vocals from American singer Jaymes Young, was released on 31 March 2015 in North America.

Music video
A music video to accompany the release of "Sonnentanz (Sun Don't Shine)" was first released onto YouTube on 15 July 2013 at a total length of three minutes and fifty-one seconds. It has received over 22 million views as of March 2016.

Parts of the video were filmed at the roof of the Ibis Wien Mariahilf hotel in Vienna, overlooking the 15th district.

Critical reception
Robert Copsey of Digital Spy gave the song a positive review stating:

"It's no secret that the freshest and most exciting dance tracks often take their time escaping the cliquey hub of Europe's party islands before they are set free and allowed to migrate over to the UK. The latest to wash up on our shores? Austrian duo Klangkarussell, whose track 'Sonnentanz' became a fave across the Balearics in its instrumental form last year. Naturally, it's been compacted into a more radio-friendly length and had lyrics laid over the top courtesy of 21-year-old newbie Will Heard, who also provides the impressively on-trend tortured soul vocal. Thankfully, none of this takes away from the wonderfully hypnotic production that provides a gentle comedown from summer we so sorely need."

Track listing

Charts

Weekly charts

Year-end charts

Certifications

Release history

References

2011 songs
2012 debut singles
2013 singles
Klangkarussell songs
Will Heard songs
Capitol Records singles
Dutch Top 40 number-one singles
Songs written by Will Heard
Tropical house songs
Universal Music Group singles
Vertigo Records singles